Grevillea parallela, also known as silver oak, beefwood or white grevillea, is a species of flowering plant in the family Proteaceae and is endemic to northern Australia. It is a single-stemmed shrub or small tree with pinnatisect or pinnatipartite leaves, the lobes linear to strap-like, and cylindrical clusters of white to cream-coloured or pale yellowish-green flowers.

Description

Taxonomy
Grevillea parallela was first formally described in 1809 by Joseph Knight in On the cultivation of the plants belonging to the natural order of Proteeae, from specimens collected by Sir Joseph Banks near the Endeavour River. The specific epithet (parallela) means "parallel" and refers to the leaf veins.

Distribution and habitat
Silver oak is found in northern Australia, in the Kimberley region of Western Australia, the top end of the Northern Territory and northern and central areas of Queensland. It grows in a variety of soils types derived from laterite, sandstone or granite. It is usually part of an open forest or woodland ecosystem with a grassy understorey. Associated species include bloodwoods (Corymbia polycarpa, C. tessellaris and C. nesophila), other eucalypts including (Eucalyptus tetrodonta, E. miniata and E. platyphylla) and Melaleuca viridiflora and Planchonia careya.

See also
 List of Grevillea species

References

parallela
Proteales of Australia
Flora of Western Australia
Flora of Queensland
Flora of the Northern Territory
Plants described in 1809